The Gates of Hell is a 2016 historical fantasy novel by Michael Livingston. The sequel to The Shards of Heaven, it explores the aftermath of the fall of Alexandria to Octavian, and the continued struggles of Juba and Cleopatra Selene.

Plot
Alexandria has fallen to Octavian, now known as Augustus, and both Mark Antony and Cleopatra are dead. A conquered Cleopatra Selene and her husband Juba are compelled to serve Augustus while secretly seeking their vengeance against the Roman Empire using the powerful artifacts known as the Shards of Heaven. While Caesarion has spirited the Ark of the Covenant out of Alexandria for its protection, and Octavian possesses the Trident of Poseidon that only Juba can control, Juba has also acquired the Aegis of Zeus from the Alexandrian tomb of Alexander the Great, and Selene steals the Palladium of Troy from the Temple of the Vestals in Rome. Octavian and Juba are soon alerted to the existence of a fifth Shard, the Lance of Olyndicus, wielded by the Cantabrian bandit Corocotta.

Characters
 Juba, son and heir to the king of Numidia, adopted by Julius Caesar after his conquest of Numidia
 Cleopatra Selene, daughter of Cleopatra and Mark Antony and now Juba's wife
 Augustus, Caesar's adopted son and heir
 Caesarion, son of Caesar and Cleopatra
 Hannah, Caesarion's Jewish wife
 Lucius Vorenus, a Roman centurion loyal to Caesarion

Writing and publication
Livingston, a historian and professor of medieval literature, said in 2015 about his choice of setting:

Noting that the trilogy "is intended to fall in the gray area between legend and history", Livingston said that while researching it he read "a great many articles and studies that might bring most folk to tears: from scholarly arguments about the construction of Roman triremes to countless ancient descriptions of places like the Great Lighthouse or the Tomb of Alexander the Great."

In a November 2015 interview, Livingston noted that the sequel to The Shards of Heaven would be called The Temples of the Ark. As of January 2016, the author's web site referred to the second installment as The Gates of Hell.

Livingston previewed the cover of The Gates of Hell on his website in March 2016. He said that the image, created by Larry Ronstant, has the same "feel" as the cover of The Shards of Heaven and features a dark-skinned Juba wearing a bloody toga praetexta.

References

2016 fantasy novels
2016 American novels
American fantasy novels
American historical novels
Fictional depictions of Augustus in literature
Novels set in ancient Egypt
Novels set in ancient Rome
Novels set in the 1st century BC
Cultural depictions of Caesarion
Tor Books books